Southwest Florida College (SWFC) was a private career training college in Florida. It has campuses in Fort Myers, Tampa and Port Charlotte, as well as a "learning site" in Bonita Springs. In 2014, Southern Technical College Suncoast LLC, acquired these campuses and changed the name to Southern Technical College. Currently, these campuses offer Bachelor's, Associate's and diploma programs on campus and online.

External links
Southwest Florida College Web site

Defunct private universities and colleges in Georgia (U.S. state)
Education in Fort Myers, Florida
Education in Tampa, Florida
Education in Charlotte County, Florida
Education in Lee County, Florida
1974 establishments in Florida